JPL is the Jet Propulsion Laboratory, a NASA research center in California.

JPL may also refer to:

Library bodies
Jefferson Parish Library, library district in Louisiana, United States
Jacksonville Public Library, library district in Florida, United States
Jewish Public Library (Montreal), library in Canada

Other uses
JPL (cyclecar), built in 1913
JPL (Integrated Communications, Inc.), an American branding and marketing company
Jon Peter Lewis (born 1979), American Idol singer-songwriter